Brownsburg-Chatham is a municipality in the Laurentides region of Quebec, Canada, part of the Argenteuil Regional County Municipality.

Economic activities include agriculture, tourism and the manufacture of explosives. It is the hometown of late Montreal Canadiens defenceman Gilles Lupien.

Geography
Brownsburg-Chatham is located along the Ottawa River, just west of Lachute, and includes the communities of Brownsburg, Cushing, Dalesville, Greece's Point, Pine Hill, and Saint-Philippe.

History
Chatham Township was established in 1799, and named after English Statesman William Pitt, 1st Earl of Chatham (1708–1778). Mostly populated by rich American Loyalists, its post office opened in 1829 and the township municipality was formed in 1845. By the mid-19th century, there were a few hamlets including Dalesville, Brownsbury, and Starneville.

In 1818, Major George Brown, born in England, was granted by the government land on the West River (Rivière de l'Ouest). Together with pioneers Daniel Smith and Captain A. L. Howard, he was able to breathe life into the local industry during the 1820s. George Brown built, among other achievements, a sawmill and gristmill which contributed to the economic growth of the region and led to the formation of Brownsburg village which was named after him. In 1854, the Brownsburg Post Office opened. Later in the third quarter of the 19th century, a major arms factory run by the Dominion Cartridge Company was the major local industry.

In 1935, the Village Municipality of Brownsburg was officially established by separating from the Township Municipality of Chatham.

On October 6, 1999, Brownsburg was rejoined with Chatham and the new Municipality of Brownsburg-Chatham was formed. On July 6, 2002, the municipality changed its statutes and became the Town of Brownsburg-Chatham.

Demographics 

Local government
The city council meetings are available online since February 2, 2016.

List of former mayors:

 Lise Bourgault (2003–2009)
 Georges Dinel (2009–2013)
 Serge Riendeau (2013–2017)
 Catherine Trickey (2017–2021)
 Kévin Maurice (2021–present)

Education
The Commission scolaire de la Rivière-du-Nord operates French-language public schools.
  École primaire Bouchard and Le Centre de Tremplin 
 École polyvalente Lavigne in Lachute

The Sir Wilfrid Laurier School Board operates English-language public schools:
 Laurentian Elementary School in Lachute serves almost all areas
 Grenville Elementary School in Grenville serves a small section of Chatham
 Laurentian Regional High School in Lachute serves all areas

See also
List of cities in Quebec

References

External links

Ville de Brownsburg-Chatham (French and English)

Cities and towns in Quebec
Incorporated places in Laurentides
Populated places established in 1799